This Is the Way the World Ends is a post-apocalyptic novel by American writer James Morrow, published in 1986.

Plot summary
This Is the Way the World Ends is a novel in which a nuclear apocalypse results from a megaton strike. The plot is driven by "The Unadmitted," a ghostly race of potential humans who never got to be born, due to nuclear holocaust. Determined to use their earthly tenures wisely, the unadmitted put the surviving architects of Armageddon—including the novel's everyman protagonist—on trial under the Nuremberg precedent.

Reception
Dave Langford reviewed This Is the Way the World Ends for White Dwarf #88, and stated that "This is a harrowingly satirical book, whose main flaw lies in its treatment of the USSR. World War II, it turns out, started by accident: but only Americans are prosecuted by the unborn, the evil Russkies being prejudged as insane and unworthy of trial. This strikes me as an insecure foundation for a scathing attack on the arms race."

Awards and nominations

References

1986 American novels
1986 science fiction novels
American post-apocalyptic novels
Henry Holt and Company books